Algeria competed at the 2016 Summer Olympics in Rio de Janeiro, Brazil, from 5 to 21 August 2016. Since the nation's debut in 1964, Algerian athletes had appeared in every edition of the Summer Olympic Games, but did not attend the 1976 Summer Olympics in Montreal, Quebec, Canada, because of the African boycott.

The Algerian Olympic Committee fielded a team of 64 athletes, 53 men and 11 women, across thirteen sports at the Games. It was the nation's largest ever delegation sent to the Olympics, breaking the record of 61 athletes, who attended the London Games four years earlier. Men's football was the only team-based sport in which Algeria had representatives at the Games, returning to the Olympic scene for the first time since 1980. Among the individual-based sports represented by the nation's athletes, Algeria marked its Olympic debut in sailing.

The Algerian team featured twelve returning Olympians, with 37-year-old marathon runner Souad Aït Salem having participated in four Olympic Games as the oldest and most experienced member. Foil fencer Anissa Khelfaoui, along with boxers Abdelhafid Benchabla and Abdelkader Chadi, was among the Algerian athletes headed to their third Olympics, while eight others previously competed in London, including defending champion Taoufik Makhloufi in middle-distance running, former French fencer Victor Sintès, and heavyweight judoka Sonia Asselah, who was selected by the committee to carry the Algerian flag at the opening ceremony, the first by a female in Summer Olympic history.

Algeria left Rio de Janeiro with only two silver medals, won by Makhloufi in both the men's 800 and 1500 metres.

Medalists

| width=78% align=left valign=top |

| width=22% align=left valign=top |

Athletics (track and field)

Algerian athletes have so far achieved qualifying standards in the following athletics events (up to a maximum of 3 athletes in each event):

A total of 15 athletes (12 men and 3 women) were named to the Algerian track and field team for the Games, including reigning Olympic champion Taoufik Makhloufi in the men's 1500 metres.

Track & road events
Men

Women

Combined events – Men's decathlon

Boxing

Algeria has entered eight boxers to compete in the following weight classes into the Olympic boxing tournament. 2012 Olympians Abdelkader Chadi and Ilyas Abbadi were the only Algerians to be selected to the Olympic team with a top two finish of their respective division in the World Series of Boxing, while five further boxers (Flissi, Benbaziz, Kedache, Benchabla, and Bouloudinat) claimed their Olympic spots at the 2016 African Qualification Tournament in Yaoundé, Cameroon.

Fahem Hammachi secured an additional Olympic place on the Algerian roster as a quarterfinalist losing to the eventual champion Mykola Butsenko of Ukraine at the 2016 AIBA World Qualifying Tournament in Baku, Azerbaijan.

Cycling

Road
Algerian riders qualified for a maximum of two quota places in the men's Olympic road race by virtue of their top 4 national ranking in the 2015 UCI Africa Tour.

Fencing

Algeria has entered two fencers into the Olympic competition. Two-time Olympian Anissa Khelfaoui claimed an Olympic spot as one of the two highest-ranked fencers from Africa outside the world's top 14 in the FIE Adjusted Official Rankings. Meanwhile, former French foil fencer Victor Sintès rounded out the roster by virtue of a top finish at the African Zonal Qualifier in Algiers.

Football

Men's tournament

Algeria men's football team qualified for the Olympics by attaining a top two finish at the 2015 U-23 Africa Cup of Nations in Senegal.

Team roster

Group play

Gymnastics

Artistic
Algeria has entered two artistic gymnasts into the Olympic competition for the first time since 1968. Mohamed Bourguieg and Farah Boufadene claimed their Olympic spots each as the only ranked male and female gymnast from Africa, respectively, at the Olympic Test Event in Rio de Janeiro.

Men

Women

Judo

Algeria has qualified five judokas for each of the following weight classes at the Games. Houd Zourdani, Lyès Bouyacoub, Mohamed-Amine Tayeb, and Abderahmane Benamadi were ranked among the top 22 eligible judokas for men in the IJF World Ranking List of 30 May 2016, while London 2012 Olympian Sonia Asselah at women's heavyweight (78 kg) earned a continental quota spot from the African region as the highest-ranked Algerian judoka outside of direct qualifying position.

Rowing

Algeria has qualified one boat each in both the men's and women's single sculls for the Games at the 2015 African Continental Qualification Regatta in Tunis, Tunisia.

Qualification Legend: FA=Final A (medal); FB=Final B (non-medal); FC=Final C (non-medal); FD=Final D (non-medal); FE=Final E (non-medal); FF=Final F (non-medal); SA/B=Semifinals A/B; SC/D=Semifinals C/D; SE/F=Semifinals E/F; QF=Quarterfinals; R=Repechage

Sailing

Algerian sailors have qualified one boat in each of the following classes through the individual fleet World Championships, and African qualifying regattas.

M = Medal race; EL = Eliminated – did not advance into the medal race

Shooting

Algeria has qualified one shooter to compete in the men's 10 m air rifle by virtue of his best finish at the African Continental Championships, as long as he obtained a minimum qualifying score (MQS) by 31 March 2016.

Qualification Legend: Q = Qualify for the next round; q = Qualify for the bronze medal (shotgun)

Swimming

Algerian swimmers have so far achieved qualifying standards in the following events (up to a maximum of 2 swimmers in each event at the Olympic Qualifying Time (OQT), and potentially 1 at the Olympic Selection Time (OST)):

Weightlifting

Algeria has qualified one male and one female weightlifter for the Rio Olympics by virtue of a top five national finish (for men) and top four (for women), respectively, at the 2016 African Championships. The team must allocate these places to individual athletes by 20 June 2016. London 2012 Olympian Walid Bidani and rookie Fatima-Zohra Bouchra were named to Algeria's Olympic roster on 8 July 2016.

Wrestling

Algeria has qualified a total of three wrestlers for each the following weight classes into the Olympic wrestling tournament. One of them finished among the top six to book an Olympic spot in the men's Greco-Roman 66 kg at the 2015 UWW World Championships, while two additional licenses were awarded to Algerian wrestlers, who progressed to the top two finals at the 2016 African & Oceania Qualification Tournament.

Men's Greco-Roman

See also
Algeria at the 2016 Summer Paralympics

References

External links

 
 

Nations at the 2016 Summer Olympics
2016
Olympics